Arius macracanthus is a species of sea catfish in the family Ariidae. It was described by Albert Günther in 1864. It is known from freshwater in Thailand.

References

macracanthus
Taxa named by Albert Günther
Fish described in 1864